The 1972 Men's World Outdoor Bowls Championship  was held at Beach House Park in Worthing, England, from 5 to 17 June 1972.  

Maldwyn Evans won the singles which was held in a round robin format. The pairs Gold was won by Hong Kong, the triples Gold by the United States and the fours Gold went to England. Scotland lifted the Leonard Trophy with just one point more than South Africa and the United States.

Medallists

Results

Men's singles – round robin

Men's pairs – round robin

Men's triples – round robin

Men's fours – round robin

W. M. Leonard Trophy

References

World Outdoor Bowls Championship
World
June 1972 sports events in the United Kingdom
1972 in British sport